Pedro Zoilo Téllez-Girón y Pérez de Guzmán, 8th Duke de Osuna, Grandee of Spain, (in full), (27 June 1728 – 1 April 1787), was a Spanish nobleman.

Pedro Téllez-Girón was the son of José María Téllez-Girón, 7th Duke of Osuna and of Francisca Pérez de Guzmán y Mendoza, daughter of Manuel Pérez de Guzmán, 12th Duke of Medina Sidonia. He married his niece María Vicenta Pacheco Téllez-Girón in 1753.

Sources

1728 births
1787 deaths
112
108
Grandees of Spain
Pedro
Knights of the Golden Fleece of Spain
107
Pedro